Quzhou is a county under the administration of the prefecture-level city of Handan, in the south of Hebei Province, China.

Administrative divisions
There are 5 towns and 5 townships under the county's administration.

Towns:
Quzhou, Anzhai, Henantuan, Houcun, Disituan

Townships:
Dahedao Township, Baizhai Township, Yizhuang Township, Nanliyue Township, Huaiqiao Township

Climate

Notes

References

Citations

Bibliography
 .

County-level divisions of Hebei
Handan